The ninth Inter-Cities Fairs Cup was played over the 1966–67 season. The competition was won by Dinamo Zagreb over two legs in the final against Leeds United. For the first time in the history of the cup, replays were scrapped, with sides going through thanks to scoring more away goals, or by tossing a coin after extra time if the sides could not be separated. Dinamo benefitted from both in the early rounds.

First round

|}

First leg

Second leg

Eintracht Frankfurt won 8–1 on aggregate.

Örgryte IS won 4–3 on aggregate.

Ferencvárosi TC won 6–3 on aggregate.

Burnley won 3–1 on aggregate.

Napoli won 5–2 on aggregate.

Juventus won 7–0 on aggregate.

Dinamo Piteşti won 4–2 on aggregate.

Dunfermline won 6–2 on aggregate.

Dinamo Zagreb won on a coin toss.

Bologna won 5–2 on aggregate.

Utrecht won 4–3 on aggregate.

Valencia won 4–1 on aggregate.

FK Red Star won 5–2 on aggregate.

1. FC Lokomotive Leipzig won 5–2 on aggregate.

R. Antwerp F.C. won 2-0 on aggregate.

FC Girondins de Bordeaux won on a coin toss.

Second round

|}

First leg

Second leg

Napoli won 6–2 on aggregate.

Juventus won 5–1 on aggregate.

Dundee United won 4–1 on aggregate.

Dinamo Pitești won 5–4 on aggregate.

Bologna won 4–3 on aggregate.

Third round

|}

First leg

Second leg

Burnley won 3–0 on aggregate.

Juventus won 3–1 on aggregate.

Dinamo Zagreb won 1–0 on aggregate.

Bologna won 6–1 on aggregate.

Quarter-finals

|}

First leg

Second leg

Dinamo Zagreb won 5–2 on aggregate.

Leeds United 1–1 Bologna on aggregate. Leeds United won on a coin toss.

Semi-finals 

|}

Final 

|}

Top goalscorers
The top scorers from the 1966–67 Inter-Cities Fairs Cup are as follows:

Source: rsssf.com

External links 
 Inter-Cities Fairs Cup results at Rec.Sport.Soccer Statistics Foundation
 Inter-Cities Fairs Cup Seasons 1966-67 – results, protocols
 website eurocups-uefa.ru Fairs' Cup Seasons 1966-67 – results, protocols
 website Football Archive 1966–67 Fairs' Cup

2
Inter-Cities Fairs Cup seasons